The Salem City Police (or SCP) is the law enforcement agency in the city of Salem, India. The SCP works under the jurisdiction of the Tamil Nadu Police.  Salem City Police has five wings: traffic wing, traffic investigation wing, prohibition enforcement wing, city crime record bureau, armed reserve, in three divisions namely Salem West, Salem South and Salem North.

History 
The Salem City Police was formed in 1972 and The Salem Police Commissionerate was formed in 1990 for the major metropolitan cities like Salem, Coimbatore, Madurai and Tiruchirapalli. The jurisdiction of Salem city police commissionarate extends jurisdiction limit to Salem City Municipal Corporation. There are 12 police stations in Salem city, numbered B-1 to B-11. City Police has five wings: traffic wing, traffic investigation wing, prohibition enforcement wing, city crime record bureau, armed reserve, in three zones Salem North, Salem South and Salem West. A law was enacted in 1987 to empower the commissionerate with the same powers as the Madras Police. Salem was fully upgraded into a police commissionerate in 1990.

Jurisdiction 
The jurisdiction of the Commissionerate of Police extends to the jurisdictional limits of the Salem City Municipal Corporation. Later in 2000 jurisdiction of Salem City Police is extended for the main suburban areas of Salem city like Ayothiyapattinam and Omalur in Salem.

 Salem City Municipal Corporation
 Ayothiapattinam
 Omalur

Stations 
There are 12 police stations in Salem city, numbered B-1 to B-11

B-1 Salem Town
B-1 Town Crime 
B-2 Shevapet
B-3 Govt.Hospital
B-4 Annadanapatti
B-5 Kitchipalayam
B-6 Ammapet
B-7 Hasthampatti
B-8 Kannankurichi
B-9 Fairlands
B-10 Pallapatti
B-11 Sooramangalam

References 

Government of Salem, Tamil Nadu
Metropolitan law enforcement agencies of India
Tamil Nadu Police
1972 establishments in Tamil Nadu
Government agencies established in 1972